James Greeley Flanders (December 13, 1844January 1, 1920) was a member of the Wisconsin State Assembly.

Biography
Flanders was born on December 13, 1844, in New London, New Hampshire. He graduated from Yale College in 1867 and from Columbia Law School in 1869. In 1873, Flanders married Mary C. Haney. They had five children. On January 1, 1920, he died in Milwaukee, Wisconsin due to a severe cold. He was buried at Forest Home Cemetery. Flanders was an Episcopalian.

Career
Flanders was a member of the Assembly during the 1877 session. He was also a school board member, and a delegate to the 1896 Democratic National Convention.

Flanders was a Milwaukee attorney and lifetime friend of Lieutenant General Arthur MacArthur Jr., led a long but successful fight on behalf of MacArthur's widow, Mrs. Mary Pinkney "Pinky" Hardy MacArthur. For some reason, Mrs. MacArthur was granted a pension of merely $1,200/per year after MacArthur died on September 5, 1912, whereas the widows of all other lieutenant generals were receiving $2,500/per year. Flanders was able to win the legal battle and have the pension for Mrs. MacArthur raised to $2,500/per year.

References

External links
The Political Graveyard

People from New London, New Hampshire
Politicians from Milwaukee
Democratic Party members of the Wisconsin State Assembly
School board members in Wisconsin
19th-century American Episcopalians
Wisconsin lawyers
Yale College alumni
Columbia Law School alumni
1844 births
1920 deaths
Burials in Wisconsin
19th-century American lawyers